Angelo Groppelli (born 12 July 1946) is a former Italian shot putter, seven-time national champion at senior level, who competed in two editions of the European Championships (1974, 1978).

National records
 Shot put: 19.20 m ( Bergamo, 3 June 1978) - record holder until 6 August 1978.

Personal bests
 Shot put: 20.03 m ( Turin, 9 June 1979)

Achievements

National titles
Groppelli won seven national championships at individual senior level.
Italian Athletics Championships
Shot put: 1975, 1978, 1979, 1980 (4)
Italian Indoor Athletics Championships
Shot put: 1976, 1979, 1980 (3)

References

External links
 

1946 births
Italian male shot putters
Living people
Sportspeople from Varese